"The Ascent" is the 107th episode of the television series Star Trek: Deep Space Nine, the ninth episode of the fifth season.

Set in the 24th century, the series follows the adventures of the crew of the Starfleet-run space station Deep Space Nine. In this episode, Deep Space Nine's security chief Odo is stranded on a remote planet with the small-time criminal Quark, and the two must hike up a mountain together to call for help. Meanwhile, Starfleet cadet Nog returns to Deep Space Nine from Starfleet Academy and has friction with his roommate Jake Sisko.

Plot
Odo is escorting Quark to a grand jury hearing where Quark is to testify against the criminal Orion Syndicate. Halfway to their destination, they discover that a bomb was planted on their ship. An attempt to transport the bomb away results in an explosion that forces them to crash-land on a frozen, barely habitable planet.

Their communication system is damaged and they have very little food. They are left facing a horrifying choice — starve to death or freeze to death — when Quark has an idea. He proposes that they haul their subspace transmitter, a heavy piece of equipment, up a nearby mountain, where the atmosphere may be thin enough to send a signal for help.

Sharing one set of cold-weather gear between them, they make their way toward the mountain, bickering all the way. They are dismayed to realize that what looked like a hike of a few hours will actually take several days. They argue throughout the journey, even as they finally begin to climb the mountain. Words soon escalate into a shoving match, and they wind up sliding down the mountainside. Odo's leg is broken in the fall.

Quark tries to drag Odo up the mountain, but it soon proves to be too much work for him. Odo insists that Quark leave him behind and continue alone to the top, but Quark, exhausted and hungry, is ready to give up. After Odo tries to take the transmitter himself, broken leg and all, Quark is shamed into resuming his attempt. But when night falls, Odo is still alone. Assuming that Quark failed to reach his goal and died, Odo assumes that he will die as well and begins recording a message intended for whoever finds his body.

Suddenly Odo and Quark are beamed to the starship Defiant—Quark did make it to the peak, and his distress signal was received. As they recuperate in the infirmary, the two assure each other that when they said they hated each other, they meant every word.

Meanwhile, on Deep Space Nine, Nog returns from Starfleet Academy for his field study. He moves in with Jake Sisko, but the two come into conflict as roommates. Nog's strictly disciplined lifestyle as a cadet conflicts with Jake's more relaxed attitudes towards life, cleanliness, and exercise. They eventually reconcile, thanks to the efforts of their fathers, Benjamin Sisko and Rom.

Production
The outdoor shots were done at Mount Whitney in California, the highest peak in the contiguous United States.

This is the final episode of Deep Space Nine to regularly feature the design of Starfleet uniforms that was introduced at the beginning of the series, although they would continue to be worn for the duration of the parallel series Star Trek: Voyager.

Reception
Tor.com gave the episode 6 out of 10.

References

External links

 

Star Trek: Deep Space Nine (season 5) episodes
1996 American television episodes